Koh-e Haji Kushtah (mountain with aromatic pines) is a mountain of the Hindu Kush Range in Afghanistan. It is in Samangan province.

Hindu Kush
Two-thousanders of Afghanistan
Landforms of Samangan Province